David Allen (February 15, 1858 – October 21, 1931) was an American Negro league first baseman in the 1880s.

A native of Madison, Virginia, Allen played for the Pittsburgh Keystones in 1887. In seven recorded games, he posted ten hits in 35 plate appearances. Allen died in Pittsburgh, Pennsylvania in 1931 at age 73.

References

External links
Baseball statistics and player information from Baseball-Reference Black Baseball Stats and Seamheads

1858 births
1931 deaths
Pittsburgh Keystones players
Baseball first basemen
Baseball players from Virginia
People from Madison, Virginia
20th-century African-American sportspeople